Mihrab Khan (died 1649) was a military commander in Safavid Iran. A member of the Mirimanidze clan, he is first mentioned as serving as the governor of Bost during an unknown date. Later, he was appointed as the governor of Astarabad, and in 1649 was appointed as the governor of the newly captured city of Qandahar, where he died during the same year. In Qandahar, he was succeeded by his Georgian kinsman Otar Beg.

Sources 
  
 
 

Safavid generals
1649 deaths
Year of birth unknown
Safavid governors of Qandahar
Persian Armenians
Iranian people of Georgian descent
Safavid ghilman
Mirimanidze
Safavid governors of Astarabad
17th-century people of Safavid Iran
Safavid slaves